The Zwiesel is a mountain, 1,782 metres high, in the Chiemgau Alps in Bavaria, Germany.

Mountains of Bavaria
Chiemgau Alps
One-thousanders of Germany
Mountains of the Alps